James Clifton Wilson (June 21, 1874 – August 3, 1951) was a United States representative from Texas and was a United States district judge of the United States District Court for the Northern District of Texas.

Education and career

Wilson was born on June 21, 1874, in Palo Pinto, Palo Pinto County, Texas. He attended the public schools and graduated from Weatherford College in 1889. He received a Bachelor of Laws from University of Texas School of Law in 1896 and was admitted to the bar the same year. He was in private practice of law in Weatherford, Texas from 1896 to 1902. He was an Assistant Prosecuting Attorney of Parker County, Texas from 1898 to 1900. He was the Prosecuting Attorney of Parker County from 1902 to 1912. He served as Chairman of the Democratic county executive committee, from 1908 to 1912. After moving to Fort Worth, Texas, he was an Assistant District Attorney of Tarrant County, Texas from 1912 to 1913. He was the United States Attorney for the Northern District of Texas from 1913 to 1917.

Congressional service

Wilson was elected as a Democrat to the United States House of Representatives of the 65th and 66th United States Congresses but only served in the 65th Congress from March 4, 1917, to March 3, 1919. He did not take his seat in the 66th Congress, instead accepting a federal judicial post.

Federal judicial service

Wilson received a recess appointment from President Woodrow Wilson on March 5, 1919, to the United States District Court for the Northern District of Texas, to a new seat authorized by 40 Stat. 1183. He was nominated to the same position by President Wilson on May 23, 1919. He was confirmed by the United States Senate on June 24, 1919, and received his commission the same day. He assumed senior status on July 31, 1947. His service terminated on August 3, 1951, due to his death in Fort Worth. He was interred at Rose Hill Cemetery in Fort Worth. In 1957, he was reinterred at Greenwood Memorial Park in Fort Worth.

References

Sources

 
 
 
 
 
 

1874 births
1951 deaths
Judges of the United States District Court for the Northern District of Texas
United States district court judges appointed by Woodrow Wilson
20th-century American judges
Democratic Party members of the United States House of Representatives from Texas
United States Attorneys for the Northern District of Texas